Three's a Crowd is a television comedy series.

Three's a Crowd may also refer to:

Media

Film and television
 Three's a Crowd (1927 film), an American comedy film
 Three's a Crowd (1932 film), a Merrie Melodies animated film
 Three's a Crowd (1945 film), an American mystery film
 Three's a Crowd (1969 film), an ABC TV movie that aired in December
 "Three's a Crowd" (Joe 90), episode 17 of Joe 90, which aired in January 1969
 "Three's a Crowd", a 1983 episode of the American TV sitcom Silver Spoons
 Three's a Crowd (game show), an American television game show airing 1979–1980
 "Three's a Crowd" (Sex and the City), a 1998 Sex and the City episode
 "Three's a Crowd" (Masters of Sex)
 "Three's a Crowd / A is for Angry", a 2005 episode of Arthur
 "Three's a Crowd", a 2009 episode of the American superhero animated television series Transformers: Animated
 "Three's a Crowd" (My Little Pony: Friendship Is Magic), a 2014 episode of My Little Pony: Friendship Is Magic
 Three's a Crowd, a working title of The Talk of the Town

Music 
 3's a Crowd (band), 1960s Canadian folk-rock band
 Three's a Crowd (musical), a 1930 Broadway musical revue
 "Three's a Crowd" (song), a 1992 song by Milira
 "Three's a Crowd", a jazz piece recorded by the Dave Brubeck Quartet for the 1961 album Countdown—Time in Outer Space

Radio
 Three's a Crowd (audio drama), a 2005 audio drama based on the TV series Doctor Who